This is a list of high school football records set by individual players in various categories in the Pennsylvania Interscholastic Athletic Association (PIAA).

Passing

Career yards 
6,001 Yards Minimum

Single Season Yards 
3,000 Yards Minimum

Single Game Yards 
400 Yards Minimum; players may have multiple games in the same year.

Career Passing Touchdowns 
Minimum 75.

Season Passing Touchdowns 
Minimum 40

Rushing

Career Yards 
6,000 Yards Minimum

Single Season Yards 
2,800 Yards Minimum

Single Game Yards 
400 Yards minimum

Season Rushing Touchdowns 
Minimum 50

Career Rushing Touchdowns 
Minimum 100

Career Total TD'S Rushing/Receiving/Return 
100  minimum

Receiving

Career Yards 
2,500 Yards Minimum

Single Season Yards 
1,200 Yards Minimum

Single Game Yards

Career receptions 
149 Minimum

Season Receptions 
Minimum 74

Career Receiving Touchdowns 
Minimum 30

Season Receiving Touchdowns 
Minimum 18
|

Single Game Touchdowns 
Minimum 5

Kicking

Longest field goal 
51 Yard Minimum

Career Kicking Points 
320 – Carter Raupach – Berlin Brothersvalley – A – 2014–2018

Single Season PAT's Converted 
118 – Ethan Haupt – Southern Columbia – AA- 2019

Coaching Records

All-Time Wins 

100 Win minimum

Miscellaneous Records

Offense
Pass/Run QB Records (Minimum 4,000 Passing, 1,400 Rushing)

Total Yards

Defense
 109-Longest Interception Return (TD)- Sishon Solomon, Murrell-Dobbins Vo-Tech interception return against Abraham Lincoln, 2011
Most interceptions in a season-Manny Masankay, Lakeland HS-18
Career Sacks – 40 – Travis Decker, Parkland HS
Season Sacks – 24 – Travis Decker, Parkland 
AbcdHS

All Time By Team Wins

Highest Winning Percentage
 77.99% Ridley, 699–189–23 (to 2019 season)

Longest Win Streak
1. 66 Clairton, 2009–2013 (18th Nationally)
2. 65 Southern Columbia, 2017-through week 5 2021
3. 59 Central Bucks West, 1997–2000 
3. 59 Bishop Guilfoyle, 2014–2017
4. 53 Central Bucks West, 1984–1988
5. 47 Ridley, 1981–1985
6. 46 Braddock, 1960
7. 44 Strath Haven, 1999–2001
7. 44 South Fayette, 2013–2015

Regular Season Win Streak
 93 Southern Columbia, 2011-through week 5 2021
 74 Strath Haven, 1996–2004 (94 Consecutive District 1 Wins)
 67 Smethport, 1989–1996
 56 South Fayette, 2012–2017
 49 windber, 1998-2002
 47 Ridley, 1981–1985
 36 Pen Argyl, 1999–2002

State Championships

All Time By Team

All Time By District

See also
List of PIAA football state champions

External links
PIAA Official Web Site.
2010–12 PIAA schools' classifications by sport at PIAA.org.

References

High school sports associations in the United States

High school sports in Pennsylvania
American football records and statistics
1913 establishments in Pennsylvania